Choi Min-ho (Hangul: 최민호; born February 17, 1983), better known by his stage name Minos (Hangul: 마이노스), is a South Korean rapper. He is currently a member of the hip hop duo Eluphant, signed to Brand New Music.

Career 
Virus
Minos debuted in 1999 as a member of the Daegu-based hip hop duo Virus with the rapper Mecca. They released their first and only EP, Pardon Me?, in 2003. Virus disbanded in 2006 because of their mandatory military service obligations.

Eluphant

In 2006, Minos and the rapper Kebee created the hip hop duo Eluphant, whose first album, Eluphant Bakery, was released that year.

Discography

Studio albums

Collaborative albums

Charted singles

Collaborations

References 

1983 births
Living people
South Korean male rappers
Brand New Music artists